The 1955 Navy Midshipmen football team represented the United States Naval Academy (USNA) as an independent during the 1955 college football season. They began the season ranked No. 8 in the pre-season AP Poll. The team was led by sixth-year head coach Eddie Erdelatz.

Schedule

Roster
QB George Welsh, Sr.

References

Navy
Navy Midshipmen football seasons
Navy Midshipmen football